The Great Northern F-8 is a class of 125 2-8-0 "Consolidation" type steam locomotives built by the Rogers Locomotive and Machine Works, their corporate successor the American Locomotive Company, and Baldwin Locomotive Works between 1901 and 1907 and operated by the Great Northern Railway until the mid 1950s. They operated throughout the Great Northern pulling freight trains with some being rebuilt with larger cylinders and higher boiler pressure, giving them more tractive effort. Retirement of the F-8s started as early as 1932, but some would last and continue to pull freight until 1956, when the last F-8 was retired.

History 
The F-8's pulled mostly freight trains throughout their career, with certain ones being rebuilt to give off more tractive effort. They operated on the Great Northern Railroad until it dieselized and by 1956 all of them were retired scrapped, except for two 1147 and 1246.

Preservation 
Great Northern 1147 was retired on June 2, 1956, and put on display in a city park in Wenatchee, Washington.

Great Northern 1246 was retired and placed on display at Woodland Park in Seattle, Washington on July 18, 1953. It went on loan to Fred Kepner in 1978 for restoration for tourist operation. It was then moved to Chemult, then Klamath and now Merrill, Oregon in 2002.1246's tender was sold to the Heber Valley Railroad in 2022 as Kepner's collection was disposed of after his death.

References

2-8-0 locomotives
Freight locomotives
Preserved steam locomotives of the United States
Railway locomotives introduced in 1902
F-8
Standard gauge locomotives of the United States
Steam locomotives of the United States
Rogers locomotives
ALCO locomotives
Baldwin locomotives